Kurt Max Franz Daluege (15 September 1897 – 24 October 1946) was chief of the national uniformed Ordnungspolizei (Order Police) of Nazi Germany. Following Reinhard Heydrich's assassination in 1942, he served as Deputy Protector for the Protectorate of Bohemia and Moravia. Daluege directed the German measures of retribution for the assassination, including the Lidice massacre. After the end of World War II, he was extradited to Czechoslovakia, tried, convicted and executed in 1946.

Early life and career
Daluege, son of a Prussian state official, was born in the small Upper Silesian town of Kreuzburg (now Kluczbork) on 15 September 1897. He entered the Prussian Army in 1916 and served with the 7th Guards Infantry Regiment. He served on the Eastern Front. In October 1917, he attended officers training in Doberitz. During his service on the Western Front, he was severely wounded in the head and shoulder. He was hospitalised and declared 25% disabled. Daluege was awarded the Iron Cross, second class (1918) and the Wound Badge in Black (1918).

1920s
After World War I, Daluege became leader of Selbstschutz Oberschlesien (SSOS) - Upper Silesian Self Defense  — an Upper Silesian veterans' organization engaged in combat with the Poles in that region. In 1921, he also became active in the Freikorps Rossbach while studying engineering at the Technical University in Berlin,  where he eventually earned a civil engineering degree. Two years later he joined the Nazi Party (NSDAP) and was assigned Party number 31,981. He also joined the Greater German Workers' Party in the same year. From 1924, he helped to organize the Berlin Frontbann, largely a front organization for the Nazi Sturmabteilung (SA), since it and the Nazi Party were banned in Prussia at that time. In 1926 he joined the SA directly, eventually becoming both the leader of Berlin's SA and Joseph Goebbels' deputy (Gauleiter, or Party leader) in Berlin. Throughout the period of 1926—1929, Daluege led the Berlin-Brandenburg division of the SA.

SS and police leader

In July 1930, in accordance with Hitler's wishes, Daluege resigned from the SA and joined the SS with the rank of SS-Oberführer and membership number 1,119. His main responsibility was to spy on the SA and political opponents of the Nazi Party. Berlin SS headquarters was strategically placed at the corner of Lützowstrasse and Potsdamerstrasse, opposite the SA headquarters.

In August 1930, when Berlin SA leader Walter Stennes had his men attack the Berlin Party headquarters, it was Daluege's SS men who defended it and put the attack down. Sometime afterwards in an open letter to Daluege, Adolf Hitler proclaimed "SS Mann, deine Ehre heißt Treue!" ("SS man, your honour is loyalty"). Then, the slogan "Meine Ehre heißt Treue" (My honour is loyalty) was duly adopted by the SS as its motto. Hitler promoted both Daluege and Heinrich Himmler to SS-Obergruppenführer, with Daluege the SS leader of northern Germany while Himmler controlled the southern SS units out of Munich in addition to serving as national leader for the entire SS. In 1932 Daluege became a Nazi Party delegate in the Prussian state Parliament, and in November 1932 was elected to the Reichstag representing the Berlin East electoral district, a seat he retained until 1945. At the same time, Hermann Göring moved Daluege to the Prussian Interior Ministry, where he took over the nonpolitical police with the rank of General der Polizei. Intrigues created by Göring, Himmler and Heydrich surrounding Ernst Röhm led to Daluege's playing an important role in the infamous "Night of the Long Knives". In that operation Röhm along with other leading members of the SA were killed between 30 June and 2 July 1934, thus neutralizing the SA and shifting the balance of power within the party to the SS.

Evidence of Daluege's ruthlessness goes beyond his intrigue against his former SA comrades, and is discernible in his remarks about anyone he considered a threat to society. He once argued that "the consciously asocial enemies of the people (Volksfeinde)" must be eliminated by state intervention "if it hopes to prevent the outbreak of complete moral degeneration." Historian George Browder claims that Daluege "bragged that the Police Institute for detective training had especially been reorganized according to NS viewpoints", and that advancement within this organization was contingent to a considerable degree on the internalization of Nazi ideology.

By November 1934, Daluege's authority over the uniformed police was extended beyond Prussia to include all of Germany. That meant he commanded municipal police forces, the rural gendarmerie, traffic police, the coastguard, the railway police, the postal protection service, fire brigades, the air-raid services, the emergency technical service, the broadcasting police, the factory protection police, building regulations enforcement, and the commercial police.

In 1936, the entire German police force was reorganized with the administrative functions previously exercised by the now largely defunct federal states reassigned to the nominal control of the Reich Interior Ministry, but under the actual control of Himmler's SS. Making the most of his police expertise and coinciding with his appointment, Daluege wrote and published a book entitled National-sozialistischer Kampf gegen das Verbrechertum (NS Struggle against Criminality). That same year, Himmler appointed Daluege as chief of the Ordnungspolizei (Orpo), which gave him administrative, though not executive, authority over most of the uniformed police in Nazi Germany. He commanded the Orpo until 1943, rising to the rank of SS-Oberst-Gruppenführer und Generaloberst der Polizei. 
Reinhard Heydrich, who took control of the SiPo (Security Police) at the same time that Daluege took control of the Orpo, thought very little of Daluege, as he was a former rival in the early struggle for power, and was contemptuously referred to by Heydrich as 'Dummi-Dummi', or 'the idiot'. 

By August 1939, the strength of the Orpo under Daluege's command and control had reached upwards of 120,000 active-duty personnel.
Further indications of the brutality coming from Daluege's office (Chief of the Ordnungspolizei), are shown in a report dated 5 September 1939, outlining the methods to be employed during pacification operations in Poland. Regarding uniformed police battalions for planned reprisal actions around the Polish town of Czestochowa, the report gave the following instructions: "[t]he leader of this battalion is ordered to take the most drastic actions and measures such as those in the upper Silesian industrial area, the hanging of Polish franc-tireurs from light poles as a visible symbol for the entire population."

During the war in 1941, he attended a mass shooting of 4,435 Jews by Police Battalion 307 near Brest-Litowsk and a mass shooting of Jews in Minsk. Furthermore, in October 1941 Daluege signed deportation orders for Jews from Germany, Austria and the Protectorate of Bohemia and Moravia, to Riga and Minsk. On 7 July 1942, he attended a conference led by Himmler which discussed the "enlargement" of Operation Reinhard, the secretive Nazi plan to mass-murder Polish Jews in the General Government district of occupied Poland, and other matters involving SS and police policies in the east.

Massacre of Lidice

In 1942 Daluege became the Deputy Protector of Bohemia and Moravia, following the assassination of Deputy Protector Reinhard Heydrich. There seemed to be almost no logic behind Hitler appointing Daluege beyond the fact that he was a senior SS officer and was already in Prague at the time, where he had arrived on the day of Heydrich's assassination for medical treatment. Hitler originally wanted to appoint Erich von dem Bach-Zelewski but Himmler persuaded Hitler not to do so, arguing that Bach-Zelewski could not be spared because of the military situation on the Eastern front.  Although Konstantin von Neurath was nominally Protector he had been stripped of his authority in 1941, so Daluege was Acting Protector in all but name. In June 1942, along with Karl Hermann Frank and other SS operatives, he ordered the villages of Lidice and Ležáky razed to the ground in reprisal for Heydrich's death. All the men in both villages were murdered, while many of the women and children were deported to Nazi concentration camps.

Personal life
On 16 October 1926, Daluege married Käthe Schwarz (born 23 November 1901) who later became a member of the Nazi Party (member no. 118,363). In 1937, Daluege and his wife adopted a son. Afterwards, Daluege's wife bore three biological children, two sons born in 1938 and 1940 and a daughter born in 1942.

In May 1943, Daluege became seriously ill after a massive heart attack. In August, he was relieved of all of his day-to-day responsibilities and spent the rest of the war living on a property in western Pomerania, given to him by Hitler.

Arrest, trial, conviction and sentence
In May 1945, Daluege was arrested by British troops in Lübeck and interned in Luxembourg and then at Nuremberg, where he was charged as "a major war criminal". In September 1946 after being extradited to Czechoslovakia, he was tried for his many crimes against humanity committed in the Protectorate of Bohemia and Moravia. Throughout his trial, Daluege was unrepentant, claiming he was beloved by "three million policemen", only following Hitler's orders, and had a clear conscience. He was convicted on all charges and sentenced to death on 23 October 1946. Daluege was hanged in Pankrác prison in Prague on 24 October 1946.

Summary of SS career

Dates of promotion
 SS-Oberführer: 25 July 1930
 SS-Gruppenführer: 1 July 1932
 Generalmajor der Landespolizei: 14 September 1933
 SS-Obergruppenführer: 9 September 1934
 Generalleutnant der Landespolizei: 20 April 1935
 General der Polizei: 17 June 1936
 SS-Oberst-Gruppenführer und Generaloberst der Polizei: 20 April 1942

Decorations
 Iron Cross, second class (1918) 
 Wound Badge in Black (1918)
 Golden Party Badge (1934)
 War Merit Cross with Swords, second class (1941) and first class (1941)
 German Cross in Silver (10 September 1942)
 Knights Cross of the War Merit Cross, with swords (7 September 1943)

See also
 List of Nazi Party leaders and officials

References

Notes

Bibliography
 
  
 
  
  
 
 
 
 
 
 
  
 Westermann, Edward B. "Friend and Helper: German uniformed police operations in Poland and the general government, 1939–1941." The Journal of Military History 58 no.4 (Oct 1994): 643.

External links
 
 
 

1897 births
1946 deaths
Holocaust perpetrators in Poland
People from Kluczbork
People from the Province of Silesia
Nazis executed by Czechoslovakia by hanging
Recipients of the Knights Cross of the War Merit Cross
Recipients of the Iron Cross (1914), 2nd class
20th-century Freikorps personnel
Members of the Reichstag of Nazi Germany
People extradited from Germany
People extradited to Czechoslovakia
Prussian Army personnel
Executed people from Opole Voivodeship
SS-Oberst-Gruppenführer
Police of Nazi Germany
Nazi Party politicians
Holocaust perpetrators in Czechoslovakia
Holocaust perpetrators in Germany
Holocaust perpetrators in Austria
People executed for crimes against humanity
Executed mass murderers
German Army personnel of World War I